Richard A. Allen (January 6, 1935 – May 29, 2005) was an American blues singer from Chicago.

He was born in Nashville, Tennessee, and began his singing career as a member of a church choir in his home town. He relocated to Chicago in 1960, and received a recording contract one year later at Age Records. He had a local hit with "You Better Be Sure" and, in 1963, his hit "Cut You A-Loose" reached Number 20 in Billboard'''s R&B chart. Some of his recordings of the 1960s, such as "It's A Mess I Tell You" and "I Can't Stand No Signifying", portended the emerging soul-blues style of the 1970s. After his retirement from the music industry in the early 1970s, he ran a laundry and a limousine service.

In 2001, he performed at the Mönsterås Festival in Sweden, and the following year at the Chicago Blues Festival. He died in 2005, aged 70.

References

 Komara, Edward (ed.) (2006), Encyclopedia of the Blues, Routledge

External links
 Obituary, Jazz News'', 2005

American blues singers
Musicians from Nashville, Tennessee
Chicago blues musicians
1935 births
2005 deaths
20th-century American singers
USA Records artists